Devi is an Indian television series which aired on Sony Entertainment Television from 20 September 2002 to 22 December 2004.  It was produced by Ajay Devgan's production house  Devgan Software from 2002 to 2004, later changed to Sujit Kumar Singh's production house Shreya Creations during the last few weeks of the series in association with Misha Gautam's production house Television Foot Prints.

Plot
Gayatri, a orphan who believes on Goddess Durga and lives with her kind hearted uncle and evil aunt.

Cast
 Sakshi Tanwar as Gayatri Vikram Sharma / Goddess Durga: Vikram's wife; Kailashnath and Revati's daughter in law, a orphan who firmly believes on Goddess Durga. She gets married to Vikram Sharma, a spoiled brat who refuses to accept her as his wife and kills her with the help of his brother in law Vasu
 Juhi Parmar as Kalika Shastri / Kalika Raj Malhotra Vikram's wife
 Mohnish Behl as Vikram Sharma
 Manish Goel as Advocate Raj Malhotra
 Madhoo as Goddess Durga
 Rajesh Khera as Vasudev Kumar
 Reena Kapoor as Kavita Sharma / Kavita Vasudev Kumar / Gayatri's Elder Sister In Law
 Kiran Dubey as Urvashi Tandon / Fake Gayatri
 Anjana Mumtaz as Revati Sharma / Maa Ji
 Rakesh Pandey as Kailashnath Sharma / Babu Ji
 Ankit Shah as Bhola
 Aman Verma as Vasudev Kumar
 Rushad Rana as Gautam Mehra
 Lata Sabharwal as Kavita Sharma / Kavita Vasudev Kumar / Gayatri's Elder Sister In Law
 Shabnam Sayed / Tasneem Khan as Pooja Sharma
 Renuka Israni as Santo Sharma / Bua Ji
 Vandita Vasa as Aparna Singh (Gayatri's Friend)
 Supriya Karnik as Kamini Satyen Kapoor / Mami Ji
 Prithvi Zutshi as Satyen Kapoor / Mama Ji
 Raymon Singh as Radhika Shastri
 Karishma Randhawa as Sonika Shastri
 Siraj Mustafa Khan as Bhramesh
 Sooraj Thapar as Agnivesh
 Alyy Khan as Rudraksh
 Nirmal Pandey as Markesh
 Rohini Hattangadi as Mrs. Malhotra 
 Puneet Vashisht as Rohit Mehra
 Chand Dhar as Guruji
 Naresh Suri as Police Commissioner Krishnakant
 Aayam Mehta as Johnny
 Dharmesh Vyas as Lallan / Mama Ji
 Manish Khanna as Advocate Kriplani
 Malini Kapoor as Deepa
 Govind Khatri as Advocate Desai
 Shiva Rindani as Raj Chhabria
 Kamal Malik as Mr. Shetty
 Vishal Thakkar as Guruji's Disciple
 Rohan Ghag as Akshay Kumar, Vasu and Kavita's son
 Nilofer Khan as Mallika Kapoor
 Aanchal Anand as Rupali Kapoor
 Hemant Choudhary as Inspector K. Mohammad
 Yashodhan Bal as Inspector A. R. Bhatt
 Sudhir Dalvi as Gaurishankar Shastri

References

External links

Indian television soap operas
Sony Entertainment Television original programming
2002 Indian television series debuts
2004 Indian television series endings
Ajay Devgn